Bridge Wives is a 1932 American pre-Code comedy film directed by Roscoe "Fatty" Arbuckle.

Plot
Mr. Smith (Alfred St. John) experiences anxiety as his wife (Fern Emmett) participates in a marathon bridge tournament.

Cast
 Al St. John as Al Smith
 Fern Emmett as Al's wife, Mrs. Smith
 Billy Bletcher as Radio announcer

See also
 Fatty Arbuckle filmography

External links

1932 films
1932 comedy films
1932 short films
American black-and-white films
Educational Pictures short films
Films directed by Roscoe Arbuckle
American comedy short films
Films with screenplays by Jack Townley
1930s English-language films
1930s American films